Stockport Town Football Club is a semi-professional football club based in Woodley, a suburb of Stockport, Greater Manchester, England. Nicknamed "the Lions", the club was founded in 2014 and were accepted into the North West Counties Football League a year later.

History
Stockport Town was founded in 2014. Based at Stockport Sports Village, the club began with ambitious aims to begin life at the tenth tier of the English football league system. Stockport Town suffered a setback in their plans after being unsuccessful in applying for the league. After positive meetings, the FA told Stockport Town they were not convinced that the club met the required standards for a new club attempting to join the North West Counties. Despite this, the club board were convinced that a year of development would only benefit the club's application chances. On 29 April 2015, three of the club's representatives travelled to Wembley to meet with the Leagues' Committee. They highlighted how the club had been successfully run over the past year, with encouraging results against some high-profile clubs from the region.

On 14 May 2015, was accepted into the North West Counties Football League Division One for the 2015–16 season.

Early beginnings
Calum Sykes was manager of the club for its first two full seasons. On 17 December 2016, Sykes announced that he was to resign, and later that same day he was announced as the manager of nearby club New Mills. On 6 January 2017, the club announced that Dave Wild, with previous experience of coaching at Northwich Victoria and Maine Road, would replace him. Wild's reign began away at FC Oswestry Town, where a rebuilt squad put a stop to consecutive defeats and earned a point in a 0–0 draw.
 
Wild would lose just 4 out of 18 matches in his half-season in charge of the Lions, ending with a win rate of 50%, securing a tenth-place finish having scored 92 goals throughout the season.

On 29 March 2018, it was announced by the club that Wild and his backroom staff were to depart with immediate effect, joining Division One North club Mossley with U21s boss, Jake Davies, put in interim charge alongside his assistant Tom Upton. During their 11 games at the helm Jake and Tom finished with a better win percentage of previous managers Dave Wild and Calum Sykes combined in which concluded a tough season for the Lions.

Concluding the 2017–18 season, the club appointed Alan Lord as manager for the new 2018–19 season with interim manager Jake Davies and Tom Upton taking up first team coaching roles for the upcoming season.

Robbie Savage signing 
Former Wales international Robbie Savage signed for the club in November 2019. He signed because he "wants to help young players to get back into football after they have been released by a club". His last professional game had been in May 2011.

In October 2020, Macclesfield Town's stadium and all available assets were purchased by Robert Smethurst, the owner of Stockport Town, with the aim of returning professional football to Macclesfield by creating the phoenix club as Macclesfield F.C. Smethurst appointed Savage as a member of the board for the new phoenix club.

Stadium
Stockport Town play their home matches at Stockport Sports Village, in Woodley, on a 3G Pitch (artificial turf). The stadium has a capacity of 2,384 spectators which includes 192 seats. In addition to the first-team pitch, the Stockport Sports Village Campus also accommodates 16 floodlit 3G pitches which are used by the local Charter Standard football teams and members of the public. The stadium was previously used by Stockport Sports before the club was liquidated in 2015.

The ground has two stands.

Shirt sponsors and manufacturers

Current squad

Club officials

Board and management officials

Coaching staff and support staff

Managerial history

Club records
 Record victory: 7–0 vs Whitchurch Alport (30 April 2016)
 Record defeat: 0–10 vs City of Liverpool (31 December 2016)
 Most goals scored in a match: 6–6 vs Eagley (6 September 2014)
 Highest home attendance: 212 vs New Mills (18 September 2017)

References

External links
 

Football clubs in the Metropolitan Borough of Stockport
Football clubs in England
North West Counties Football League clubs
Association football clubs established in 2014
2014 establishments in England